Early Singles is a compilation album released on March 11, 1997 by the Washington, D.C.-based go-go band Trouble Funk. The album consists of a compilations of the band earlier singles from the late-70s to the early-80s.

Track listing

Personnel
Tony Fisher – bass guitar, vocals
Chester Davis – electric guitar
James Avery – keyboards
Robert Reed – keyboards, trombone
Timothy David – percussion
Mack Carey – percussion
Taylor Reed – trumpet
David Rudd – saxophone
Gerald Reed – trombone

References

External links
Early Singles at Discogs

1997 compilation albums
Trouble Funk albums
Rhythm and blues compilation albums